The 1932 United States presidential election was the 37th quadrennial presidential election, held on Tuesday, November 8, 1932. The election took place against the backdrop of the Great Depression. The incumbent Republican President Herbert Hoover was defeated in a landslide by Democrat Franklin D. Roosevelt, the Governor of New York and the vice presidential nominee of the 1920 presidential election. Roosevelt was the first Democrat in 80 years to simultaneously win an outright majority of the electoral college and popular vote, a feat last accomplished by Franklin Pierce in 1852, as well as the first Democrat in 50 years to win a majority of the popular vote, which was last done by Samuel J. Tilden in 1876. Hoover was the last incumbent president to lose an election to another term until Gerald Ford lost 44 years later. The election marked the effective end of the Fourth Party System, which had been dominated by Republicans. It was the first time since 1916 that a Democrat was elected president. 

Despite disastrous economic conditions due to the Great Depression, Hoover faced little opposition at the 1932 Republican National Convention. Roosevelt was widely considered the front-runner at the start of the 1932 Democratic National Convention, but was not able to clinch the nomination until the fourth ballot of the convention. The Democratic convention chose a leading Southern Democrat, Speaker of the House John Nance Garner of Texas, as the party's vice presidential nominee. Roosevelt united the party, campaigning on the failures of the Hoover administration. He promised recovery with a "New Deal" for the American people.

Roosevelt won by a landslide in both the electoral and popular votes, carrying every state outside of the Northeast and receiving the highest percentage of the popular vote of any Democratic nominee up to that time. Hoover had won over 58% of the popular vote in the 1928 presidential election, but his share of the popular vote declined to 39.6% in 1932. Socialist Party nominee Norman Thomas won 2.2% of the popular vote. Subsequent Democratic landslides in the 1934 mid-term elections and the 1936 presidential election confirmed the commencement of the Fifth Party System, which was dominated by Roosevelt's New Deal Coalition.  Roosevelt's election ended the era of Republican dominance in presidential politics that lasted from the beginning of the Civil War in 1860 to the middle of the Great Depression in 1932.

Background

Republican nominee Herbert Hoover had won in the 1928 presidential election against Democratic nominee Al Smith. Smith had lost the support of the Solid South during the campaign. Hoover had won in a landslide with him winning forty of the forty-eight states giving him 444 electoral votes against Smith's 87. However, the Wall Street Crash of 1929 and the Great Depression weakened the power of the Republicans. In the 1930 elections, the Democrats gained control of the United States House of Representatives, reduced the Republican majority in the United States Senate to one, and won a majority of the governorships.

Smith was the first Democratic nominee in the 20th century to win a majority of the twelve largest cities in the country. The net vote totals in the twelve largest cities shifted from Republican to Democratic with Harding having won 1,540,000 in 1920, Coolidge by 1,308,000 in 1924, while Smith won by 210,000. Samuel Lubell wrote in The Future of American Politics that Franklin D. Roosevelt's victory in the 1932 election was preceded by Smith's increased vote totals in urban areas.

Nominations

Democratic Party nomination

Democratic candidates:
 Franklin D. Roosevelt, governor of New York
 Al Smith (campaign), former governor of New York and 1928 Democratic presidential nominee
 John Nance Garner, U.S. Speaker of the House, of Texas
 William H. Murray, governor of Oklahoma

Smith, who announced his candidacy on February 6, 1932, was a leading candidate as he had remained active in the party and retained his support from the 1928 campaign. Joseph Taylor Robinson, who had been Smith's vice-presidential running mate, announced that he would not be a candidate on March 31, 1932, and gave his support to Franklin D. Roosevelt. Jesse I. Straus conducted a poll of the delegates to the 1928 Democratic National Convention which showed that the majority supported Roosevelt and additional polling showed Roosevelt winning in the primary and general election. Representative Edgar Howard stated that "Nine out of ten men in nine out of ten states are for Roosevelt, and he will be the Democratic choice." Roosevelt announced his campaign on January 23, 1932.

William H. Murray ran in multiple primaries and won one delegate in the North Dakota primary, but failed to win in the Florida, Nebraska, Oregon, and West Virginia primaries. He won in the Ohio primary as he was the only candidate on the ballot, but the delegates were instructed by the convention and not the primary. The Oklahoma convention selected to give him control of its twenty-two member delegation.

Newton D. Baker declined to run in the primaries and instead planned on serving as a compromise candidate if neither Smith nor Roosevelt could win the nomination at the convention balloting. J. Hamilton Lewis won the presidential primary in Illinois on April 12, 1932, and the state's fifty-eight member delegation was instructed to vote for him, but he withdrew before the convention on June 25. The majority of the Illinois delegation supported Melvin Alvah Traylor for the first three ballots before giving their support to Roosevelt on the fourth ballot. Tom Pendergast, a political boss in Missouri, had the state's delegation instructed to vote for James A. Reed, who had run for the nomination in the 1928 election, and the delegation supported Reed for the first three ballots before switching to Roosevelt. Harry F. Byrd and George White were favorite son candidates from their states. A. Harry Moore was a favorite son candidate supported by Lewis, but the delegation of his home state New Jersey voted for Smith.

Both Smith and Roosevelt were against Prohibition, but Smith supported making it a main issue during the campaign while Roosevelt did not. John J. Raskob, who had become the chair of the Democratic National Committee with Smith's support, attempted to have the committee make a statement against prohibition in March 1931, and Smith gave a speech in support of it. James Farley, the chair of the New York State Democratic Committee and later Roosevelt's presidential campaign manager, had the New York committee pass a resolution opposing declarations before the national convention was held. Other state parties supported this resolution causing the vote to not happen. Raskob proposed the declaration again on January 9, 1932, but had the committee not take action on it.

Tammany Hall and Roosevelt had a truce during his governorship, but the organization came to openly oppose him for his role in Mayor Jimmy Walker's resignation. Tammany Hall supported Smith for the nomination at the convention causing Roosevelt to refuse to support their mayoral candidate in the 1933 election and to support Fiorello La Guardia in the 1937 election. Tammany Hall's power was also reduced by the adoption of proportional representation for the New York City Council. Roosevelt also gave support to the American Labor Party in order for Democratic voters to support the New Deal without giving support to Tammany Hall candidates. Representative John J. O'Connor, who represented one of the districts with the strongest Tammany influence and was the chair of the House Rules Committee, lost renomination in the Democratic primary and in the general election with the Republican nomination in the 1938 election.

Smith's strategy against Roosevelt was to use favorite son candidates to control the delegations of their states in places that would have otherwise gone for Roosevelt. The majority of Smith's support came from the northeast while Roosevelt's support came from the south and west. Wilbur Lucius Cross, Joseph B. Ely, Frank Hague, J. Howard McGrath, Moore, Raskob, and Jouett Shouse were among Smith's campaign leaders. Roosevelt attempted to have some of the favorite son candidates withdraw using Homer Stille Cummings as a mediator, but he was unsuccessful.

Seventeen states used primaries to select their delegates to the national conventions while the rest used a convention system. Roosevelt controlled the delegations from thirty states and additional delegations from Arkansas, Indiana, Kansas, and South Carolina had supporters of Roosevelt, but were uninstructed. Roosevelt was endorsed at the state convention in Mississippi, but the delegates were left uninstructed. Roosevelt also claimed that he had the support of the twenty-eight delegates from all of the territories. Smith controlled the delegates from four states. The remaining delegations were either uninstructed or under the control of favorite sons. Roosevelt failed to gain control of two-thirds of the delegates which was required for him to gain the nomination.

The convention was held in Chicago between June 27 and July 2. The first vote was taken at 4:28 on the morning of July 2, after ten hours of speeches that had begun at 5:00 on the previous afternoon. The Roosevelt delegations from Louisiana and Minnesota were seated giving Roosevelt an additional thirty-two votes. Thomas J. Walsh, an ally of Roosevelt, was elected to chair the convention against Shouse by a vote of 626 to 528. Roosevelt received the most votes on the first three ballots, but he still did not have a two-thirds majority. 

John Nance Garner, who had the support of William Randolph Hearst, won in the California primary due to the support of the Texas State Society of California which had 100,000 members. Garner had the support of ninety delegates at the convention and Hearst created a compromise with Roosevelt. Roosevelt, who needed the support of the Californian and Texan delegations to gain a two-thirds majority, would receive the support of Garner's delegates in exchange for Garner being given the vice-presidential nomination. With this agreement, Garner's supporters in California and Texas were released by Sam Rayburn, Garner's campaign manager, and voted for Roosevelt on the fourth ballot, giving him the presidential nomination. Members of the Texas delegation who opposed Roosevelt were led by Amon G. Carter, but the Roosevelt supporters led by Thomas Whitfield Davidson won by a vote of 54 to 51. Connecticut, Massachusetts, New Jersey, New York, and Rhode Island were the only states whose delegations did not support Roosevelt on the final ballot. Garner won the vice-presidential nomination on the first ballot against Matthew A. Tinley and his nomination was made unanimous.

Republican Party nomination

Republican candidates:
 Herbert Hoover, President of the United States
 Joseph I. France, former Senator from Maryland
 Calvin Coolidge, former President of the United States (declined)
 Dwight Morrow, Senator from New Jersey (died)

In November 1931, Senator Hiram Johnson called for Hoover to retire as it would increase the chances of the Republicans winning in the 1932 election. Hoover's opponents in the Republican Party supported giving either former President Calvin Coolidge or Senator Dwight Morrow the party's presidential nomination. Morrow had been elected to the U.S. Senate from New Jersey in 1930, but died on October 5, 1931. On July 31, 1931, an article by James F. Coupal, Coolidge's former White House physician, was published by the St. Paul Dispatch in which Coupal stated that Coolidge would run "if the people of this country evince an unmistakable and unquestionable desire to draft him to pull the country out of this period of depression, and if he can have the presidency without any political or other obligations attached to it". Coolidge did not run for the nomination and an article written by him was published by The Saturday Evening Post on October 3, 1932, in which he gave his support to Hoover and was critical of those who had wanted him to run.

Charles G. Dawes was suggested as a candidate following Morrow's death and the unsuccessful attempt to draft Coolidge, but his selection as president of the Reconstruction Finance Corporation took him out of consideration. Progressive Republicans considered forming a third party, but William Borah, Johnson, George W. Norris, and Gifford Pinchot declined to lead such a movement. An attempt to have progressive leaders in multiple states run against Hoover failed and Borah stated that Hoover could not be defeated.

Hoover formally started his campaign by having Robert H. Lucas, executive director of the Republican National Committee, send out letters to precinct leaders in January 1931. Postmaster General Walter Folger Brown and Treasury Secretary Ogden L. Mills helped manage Hoover's campaign. Theodore Joslin started a publicity campaign to improve Hoover's image.

Joseph I. France, a member of the conservative faction, ran against Hoover in the primary, but only won in states where he was unopposed. These states also had no delegates bounded to their primaries leading to them sending pro-Hoover delegations. At the national convention Lawritz Bernhard Sandblast, a delegate from Oregon, nominated France, but France attempted to address the convention to withdraw his candidacy and instead nominate Coolidge. Hoover had him removed citing that he could not address the convention as he was not a delegate. Hoover, who was nominated by Joseph Scott, won renomination on the first ballot while France only received four delegates.

Dawes was proposed as a replacement for Vice President Charles Curtis, who faced opposition due to his age and prohibitionist stances, and delegations from over twenty states opposed the renomination of Curtis. However, Dawes declined to seek the vice-presidential nomination. Curtis, Alvan T. Fuller, James Harbord, Hanford MacNider, J. Leonard Replogle, and Bertrand Snell were nominated for the vice-presidential balloting. Curtis initially fell 19.25 votes short of winning on the first ballot, but the Pennsylvania delegation changed its support to Curtis causing him to win.

Other candidates

Socialist Party
Norman Thomas, who had been the Socialist Party of America's presidential nominee in the 1928 election and ran for a seat in the U.S. House of Representatives in the 1930 election, and James H. Maurer, who was the party's vice-presidential nominee in the 1928 election, were given the Socialist Party presidential and vice-presidential nominations at the national convention held May 21–24 in Milwaukee. Thomas and his faction unsuccessfully tried to have Morris Hillquit replaced as chair of the party by Daniel Hoan. The Literary Digest's polling predicted that Thomas would receive over two million votes.

Communist Party
William Z. Foster, who had been the Communist Party USA's presidential nominee in the 1928 election, was given the presidential nomination at the national convention held from May 28–29 in Chicago, and James W. Ford was given the vice-presidential nomination.

Farmer-Labor Party
Frank Webb and former Mayor Jacob S. Coxey Sr. were given the presidential and vice-presidential nominations of the Farmer–Labor Party at its convention on April 28 in Omaha, Nebraska. John R. Brinkley, Thomas Mooney, and Arthur C. Townley had also been proposed as candidates for the nomination. However, Webb was removed from the ticket with the party stating that he was "a tool of the Hoover administration," and Coxey was given the presidential nomination. The Minnesota Farmer–Labor Party did not support the national party's ticket. After having the Farmer-Labor presidential nomination taken from him Webb formed the Liberty Party with him as its presidential nominee while the larger Liberty Party gave its nomination to William Hope Harvey.

Liberal Party
Samuel Harden Church, who had formed the Liberal Party in Pennsylvania which received 366,572 votes on its ballot line in the 1930 gubernatorial election, unsuccessfully tried to form a national anti-prohibitionist Liberal Party. Nicholas Murray Butler proposed the creation of a new party on May 19, 1932, which would be composed of the moderate wings of both existing Democratic and Republican parties.

General election

Campaign 

After making an airplane trip to the Democratic convention, Roosevelt accepted the nomination in person. In his speech, he stated, "ours must be a party of liberal thought, of planned action, of the enlightened international outlook, and of the greatest good to the greatest number of our citizens." Roosevelt's trip to Chicago was the first of several successful, precedent-making moves designed to make him appear to be the candidate of change in the election. Large crowds greeted Roosevelt as he traveled around the nation; his campaign song "Happy Days Are Here Again" became one of the most popular in American political history – and, indeed, the unofficial anthem of the Democratic Party. Democratic leaders in the eastern United States supported having Roosevelt conduct a front porch campaign, but Roosevelt and the leaders in the western United States instead supported an active campaign. Roosevelt gave twenty-seven major speeches during the campaign while Hoover initially planned on giving three major speeches during the campaign, but it was later increased to ten and Hoover traveled over 10,000 miles.

Simeon D. Fess, who had become chair of the Republican National Committee with Hoover's support, resigned from his position and was replaced by Everett Sanders with Hoover's support. Raskob, who became the chair of the Democratic National Convention with Smith's support, was replaced by Farley. Campaign expenditures for both parties fell from the 1928 election to the 1932 election. The combined expenditures of both national committees would be $5,146,027 which was less than $0.13 per voter. This was the lowest amount spent per voter since the 1912 election with most elections costing around $0.19-0.20 per voter and the 1924 presidential election costing $0.15 per voter.

Both parties spent large amounts on radio campaigns with 17-18% of Democratic and over 20% of the Republican national committees spending being towards radio. During the 1928 election the Republicans paid $420,000 to radio companies and increased their spending to $437,000 during the 1932 election. The Democrats reduced their spending with their amount falling from $550,000 during the 1928 election to $343,415 during the 1932 election.

During the campaign NBC and CBS aired 203 programs of paid time that took up 116 hours and 15 minutes. One hundred thirty-six of those programs were for the Republicans, seventy-one for the Democrats, and three for the Socialists. The Republicans had seventy hours and thirty-two minutes, the Democrats had forty-nine hours and thirty-two minutes, and the Socialists had forty-five minutes of air time.

Roosevelt made gains with voters compared to Smith's 1928 campaign. The southerners who had supported Hoover in the 1928 campaign returned to the Democratic Party and progressive Republicans under the leadership of Bronson M. Cutting, Johnson, Robert M. La Follette Jr., Norris, and Henry A. Wallace left the Republicans to support Roosevelt. Farley predicted that Roosevelt would win in forty-four states and later congratulated Sanders on his imagination and courage when Sanders predicted that Hoover would win 338 electoral votes.

After their divisive convention, Democrats united around Roosevelt, who was able to draw more universal support than Al Smith had in 1928. Roosevelt's Protestant background prevented the anti-Catholic attacks Smith faced in 1928, and The Depression seemed to be of much greater concern among the American public than previous cultural battles. Prohibition was increasingly unpopular, and wets offered the argument that states and localities needed the tax money. Hoover proposed a new constitutional amendment that was vague on particulars and satisfied neither side. Roosevelt's platform promised repeal of the 18th Amendment.

In contrast, Hoover was not supported by many of the more prominent Republicans and violently opposed by others, in particular by a number of senators who had fought him throughout his administration and whose national reputation made their opposition of considerable importance. Many prominent Republicans even went so far as to espouse the cause of the Democratic candidate openly.

Making matters worse for Hoover was the fact that many Americans blamed him for the Great Depression. The outrage caused by the deaths of veterans in the Bonus Army incident in the summer of 1932, combined with the catastrophic economic effects of Hoover's domestic policies, reduced his chances of a second term from slim to none. His attempts to campaign in public were a disaster, as he often had objects thrown at him or his vehicle as he rode through city streets. Hoover's unpopularity resulted in Roosevelt adopting a cautious campaign strategy, focused on minimizing gaffes and keeping public attention directed towards his opponent.

As Governor of New York, Roosevelt had garnered a reputation for promoting government help for the impoverished, providing a welcome contrast for many who saw Hoover as a do-nothing president. Roosevelt emphasized working collectively through an expanded federal government to confront the economic crisis, a contrast to Hoover's emphasis on individualism. During the campaign, Roosevelt ran on many of the programs that would later become part of the New Deal during his presidency. It was said that "even a vaguely talented dog-catcher could have been elected president against the Republicans." Hoover even received a letter from an Illinois man that advised, "Vote for Roosevelt and make it unanimous."

Roosevelt employed the radio to great effect during the campaign. He was able to outline his platform while also improving the perception of his personality. In March, 1932, The New York Times quoted radio producer John Carlile, who said that Roosevelt had a "tone of perfect sincerity," while for Hoover, "the microphone betrays deliberate effort in his radio voice." The technology not only allowed Roosevelt to reach far more voters than he could via in-person campaigning, but also drew attention away from his paralysis due to polio. Roosevelt took great pains to hide the effects of the disease from voters, instituting a "gentleman's agreement" with the press that he not be photographed in ways that would highlight his disability.

The election was held on November 8, 1932.

Results 

Roosevelt defeated Hoover in the election. Hoover became the seventh president to lose reelection after John Adams, John Quincy Adams, Martin Van Buren, Grover Cleveland, Benjamin Harrison, and William Howard Taft. Another president would not lose an election to another term until Gerald Ford was defeated by Jimmy Carter in the 1976 presidential election. This was the first election since 1916 (16 years earlier) in which the Democratic candidate won.

Although the "other" vote (the combined vote total for candidates other than the nominees of the two major parties) of 1932 was three times that of 1928, it was considerably less than what had been recorded in 1920, the time of the greatest "other" vote, with the exception of the unusual conditions prevailing in 1912 and 1924.

Roosevelt, the Democratic candidate, received 22,817,883 votes (57.41%), the largest vote ever cast for a candidate for the Presidency up until that time, and over 1,425,000 more than that cast for Hoover four years earlier.

While Hoover had won a greater percentage of the vote in 1928 (as did Harding in 1920), the national swing of 17.59% to the Democrats impressed all who considered the distribution of the vote: more than one-sixth of the electorate had switched from supporting the Republicans to the Democrats. Only once before had there been a comparable shift, in 1920, when there was a 14.65% swing to the Republicans (while there had been a swing to the Democrats of 13.6% in 1912, this was from a three-candidate election).

Roosevelt improved on Smith's net vote total performance in the twelve largest cities. Smith had won those areas by 210,000 votes in the 1928 election while Roosevelt won by 1,791,000 votes. Roosevelt's worst performance in the country was in the eastern United States where all six of the states that voted for Hoover came from. Hoover only won in forty-five counties west of the Mississippi.

The largest swing since came for the Democrats in 1976, when the swing from George McGovern in 1972 to Jimmy Carter was 12.61%.

1932 was a political realignment election: not only did Roosevelt win a sweeping victory over Hoover, but Democrats significantly extended their control over the U.S. House, gaining 101 seats, and also gained 12 seats in the U.S. Senate to gain control of the chamber. Twelve years of Republican leadership came to an end, and 20 consecutive years of Democratic control of the White House began.

Until 1932, the Republicans had controlled the Presidency for 52 of the previous 72 years, dating back to Abraham Lincoln being elected president in 1860. After 1932, Democrats would control the Presidency for 28 of the next 36 years.

Roosevelt led the poll in 2,722 counties, the greatest number ever carried by a candidate up until that time. Of these, 282 had never before been Democratic. Only 374 remained loyally Republican. Half of the total vote of the nation was cast in just eight states (New York, New Jersey, Pennsylvania, Ohio, Illinois, Indiana, Michigan, and Wisconsin); in these states, Hoover polled 8,592,163 votes. In one section (West South Central), the Republican percentage sank to 16.21%, but in no other section did the party poll less than 30% of the vote cast. However, the relative appeal of the two candidates in 1932 and the decline of the appeal of Hoover as compared with 1928 are shown in the fact that the Republican vote increased in 1932 in only 87 counties, while the Democratic vote increased in 3,003 counties. Herbert Hoover also failed to flip any counties.

The vote cast for Hoover, and the fact that in only one section of the nation (West South Central) did he have less than 500,000 votes and in only three states outside of the South less than 50,000 votes, made it clear that the nation remained a two-party electorate, and that everywhere, despite the overwhelming triumph of the Democrats, there was a party membership devoted to neither the new administration nor the proposals of the Socialist candidate who had polled 75% of the "other" vote (as well as the highest raw vote total of his campaigns).

This election marks the last time as of  that a Republican presidential candidate won a majority of black and African-American votes: as New Deal policies took effect, the strong support of black voters for these programs began a transition from their traditional support for Republicans to providing solid majorities for Democrats.

The Roosevelt ticket swept every region of the country except the Northeast, and carried many reliable Republican states that had not been carried by the Democrats since their electoral landslide of 1912, when the Republican vote was split in two.

Michigan voted Democratic for the first time since the emergence of the Republican Party in 1854, and Minnesota was carried by a Democrat for the first time since its admission to statehood in 1858, leaving Vermont as the only remaining state never to be carried by a Democratic candidate (which it would not be until 1964).

In contrast to the state's solid support of Republicans prior to this election, Minnesota has continued supporting Democrats in every presidential election but three since 1932 (the exceptions were in 1952, 1956, and 1972).

Roosevelt's victory with 472 electoral votes stood until the 1964 victory of Lyndon B. Johnson, who won 486 electoral votes in 1964, as the most ever won by a first-time contestant in a presidential election. Roosevelt also bettered the national record of 444 electoral votes set by Hoover only four years earlier, but would shatter his own record when he was re-elected in 1936 with 523 votes.

This was the last election in which Connecticut, Delaware, New Hampshire and Pennsylvania voted Republican until 1948.

Source (popular vote): Source (electoral vote):

Geography of results

Cartographic gallery

Results by state

Close states 
Margin of victory less than 5% (74 electoral votes):
 Connecticut, 1.14% (6,788 votes)
 New Hampshire, 1.43% (2,949 votes)
 New Jersey, 1.90% (30,988 votes)
 Delaware, 2.44% (2,754 votes)
 Ohio, 2.85% (74,376 votes)
 Massachusetts, 4.00% (63,189 votes)

Margin of victory between 5% and 10% (64 electoral votes):
 Pennsylvania, 5.51% (157,592 votes)
 Michigan, 7.92% (131,806 votes)
 Kansas, 9.43% (74,706 votes)

Tipping point state:
 Iowa, 17.71% (183,586 votes)

Statistics 
Counties with Highest Percent of Vote (Democratic)
 Wilkinson County, Georgia 100.00%
 Armstrong County, South Dakota 100.00%
 Lancaster County, South Carolina 99.84%
 Sharkey County, Mississippi 99.82%
 Colleton County, South Carolina 99.69%

Counties with Highest Percent of Vote (Republican)
 Johnson County, Tennessee 84.51%
 Jackson County, Kentucky 84.28%
 Leslie County, Kentucky 82.96%
 Owsley County, Kentucky 79.08%
 Sevier County, Tennessee 77.01%

Counties with Highest Percent of Vote (Other)
 Sheridan County, Montana 32.54%
 Thurston County, Washington 23.12%
 Clallam County, Washington 22.73%
 Berks County, Pennsylvania 22.17%
 Lake County, Minnesota 21.75%

See also 
 1932 United States Senate elections
 1932 United States House of Representatives elections
 History of the United States (1918–1945)
 Timeline of the Great Depression
 Causes of the Great Depression
 Great Contraction
 First inauguration of Franklin D. Roosevelt
 Presidency of Franklin D. Roosevelt

References

Further reading 
 Andersen, Kristi.  The Creation of a Democratic Majority: 1928–1936 (1979), statistical study of voting patterns
 Burns, James Macgregor. Roosevelt the Lion and the Fox (1956) online pp 123–52.
 Carcasson, Martin. "Herbert Hoover and the presidential campaign of 1932: The failure of apologia." Presidential Studies Quarterly 28.2 (1998): 349–365. in JSTOR
 
 Freidel, Frank  Franklin D. Roosevelt The Triumph (1956) covers 1929–32 in depth online
 Freidel, Frank.  "Election of 1932", in Arthur M. Schlesinger, Jr., ed., The Coming to Power: Critical Presidential Elections in American History (1981)
 Gosnell, Harold F., Champion Campaigner: Franklin D. Roosevelt (1952)
 
 
 Hoover, Herbert. The Memoirs of Herbert Hoover: The Great Depression, 1929–1941 (1952)
 
 
 
 Pietrusza, David 1932: The Rise of Hitler and FDR: Two Tales of Politics, Betrayal and Unlikely Destiny (2015)
 Ritchie, Donald A. Electing FDR: The New Deal Campaign of 1932 (2007)
 
 Robinson, Edgar Eugene. The Presidential Vote, 1896–1932 (Stanford university press, 1940) voting returns for every county
 Schlesinger, Jr., Arthur M. The Crisis of the Old Order (1957), pp 427–54 online

Primary sources 
 Chester, Edward W  A guide to political platforms (1977) online
 Porter, Kirk H. and Donald Bruce Johnson, eds. National party platforms, 1840-1964 (1965) online 1840-1956

External links 

 1932 popular vote by counties

 Election of 1932 in Counting the Votes

 
Presidency of Franklin D. Roosevelt
Franklin D. Roosevelt
Herbert Hoover